Clancy Martin (born May 7, 1967) is a Canadian philosopher, novelist, and essayist. His interests focuses on 19th century philosophy, existentialism, moral psychology, philosophy and literature, ethics & behavioral health, applied and professional ethics (especially bioethics) and philosophy of mind.

A Guggenheim Fellow, Clancy has authored and edited more than a dozen books in philosophy, including Love and Lies, Honest Work, Introducing Philosophy, Ethics Across the Professions and The Philosophy of Deception. He has written more than a hundred articles, essays and short pieces on Kierkegaard, Nietzsche, Romanticism, the virtue of truthfulness, and many other subjects, and has also translated works of Nietzsche and Kierkegaard from German and Danish, including a complete translation of Thus Spoke Zarathustra. Combining memoir with critical enquiry, Clancy's major forthcoming book, How not to kill yourself: A Portrait of the Suicidal Mind, promises to be an intimate, insightful, and helpful depiction of the mindset of someone obsessed with self-destruction.

Clancy is also a Pushcart Prize-winning fiction writer and author of two novels, How to Sell: A Novel and Travels in Central America. In How to Sell, he captures the luxury business in all its exquisite vulgarity and outrageous fraud, finding in it a metaphor for the American soul at work. His novels have earned acclamation from publications such as Times Literary Supplement, The Guardian, L.A. Times, Publishers Weekly and The Kansas City Star.

His writing has appeared in The New Yorker, Harper's Magazine, The New Republic, The New York Times, The Wall Street Journal, The London Review of Books, The Atlantic, The Times Literary Supplement, Lapham's Quarterly, Ethics, The Believer, The Journal of the History of Philosophy, GQ, Esquire, Details, Elle, Travel + Leisure, Bookforum, Vice, Men's Journal, and many other newspapers, magazines and journals, and has been translated into more than thirty languages. He is a regular contributor to Diane Williams' esteemed literary annual NOON.

Clancy is Professor of Philosophy at the University of Missouri in Kansas City, and is Professor of Business Ethics at the Henry W. Bloch School of Management (UMKC). He is also Professor of Philosophy at Ashoka University.

Clancy has also won a German Academic Exchange Service Fellowship and is a contributing editor at Harper's Magazine.

Biography

Clancy Martin was born on May 7, 1967, as the middle child in a family of three boys. His father Bill was a type 1 diabetic, and a successful real estate developer in Toronto and Calgary, Canada. Bill became involved in New Age spirituality, founding a "Church of Living Love" in Palm Beach, Florida in 1976. The church expanded to several locations before foundering. Bill would launch a number of such churches with ephemeral success. He died in 1997 in the psychiatric ward of a hospital for indigent persons.

Clancy earned his B.A. degree at Baylor University. He attended graduate school at University of Texas, Austin, in the philosophy department. He quit in the early 1990s to start a jewelry business with his older brother. He resumed his graduate studies after his father died in 1997. He received his PhD in philosophy from UT Austin in 2003. He then went on to teach at University of Missouri, Kansas City, where he is now a professor of philosophy.

Martin is married to the writer Amie Barrodale.

Bibliography 
The Ethics of Luxury (New York: Columbia University Press. Forthcoming, 2023)
How Not to Kill Yourself: A Phenomenology of Suicide (New York: Pantheon/Knopf. Forthcoming, March, 2023
Honest Work. With Joanne Ciulla and Robert C. Solomon (New York: Oxford University Press, 2006.  2/e 2010. 3/e 2014. 4/e 2018. 5/e 2022) 
The Philosophy of Love and Sex. Edited With Carol Hay. New York: Oxford University Press, 2022.
Ethics Across the Professions. With Robert C. Solomon and Wayne Vaught (New York: Oxford University Press. 2009. 2/e 2017. 3/e 2022) 
Love and Lies: An Essay on Truthfulness, Deceit, and the Growth and Care of Erotic Love (New York: Farrar, Straus, and Giroux, 2015; Picador, 2016. London: Harvill Secker, 2015, Vintage, 2016)  
Introducing Philosophy. With Kathleen Higgins and Robert C. Solomon. (New York: Oxford University Press. 9/e 2008, 10/e 2011. 11/e 2016. 12/e 2019)  
The German Sisyphus: On the Happy Burden of Responsibility. With Andrew Bergerson, Steve Ostovich, and Scott Baker (New York and Berlin: De Gruyter, 2011)
The Philosophy of Deception. Editor (New York: Oxford University Press, 2009)  
Since Socrates. With Robert C. Solomon (Belmont: Wadsworth, 2004)  
Morality and The Good Life. With Robert C. Solomon (New York: McGraw Hill, 2003) 5/e with Robert C. Solomon and Wayne Vaught. 2009  
Above The Bottom Line: An Introduction to Business Ethics. With Robert C. Solomon (Belmont: Wadsworth, 2003)

Fiction 
Bad Sex (New York: Tyrant Books, 2015). Also published in English—in a somewhat different form—as Travels in Central America (Milan: The Milan Review. 2012; in Italian as Adulterio in Central America (Rome: Indiana Editore, 2013). And as Love in Central America (London: Harvill Secker, 2016), and various other international publishers. 
How to Sell (New York: Farrar, Straus and Giroux, 2009; Picador, 2010) Also appeared in German, French, Italian, Spanish, Korean, and Chinese. Optioned  by Sony for film in 2011.

Major translation 
 Friedrich Nietzsche, Thus Spoke Zarathustra (New York: Barnes and Noble Classics, 2005)

Reviews

Selected Awards 

 “Best Author of 2015.” & "Best Author of 2009."  The Kansas City Pitch. 
 “Ten Best Books Ever Written on Failed Romance.”  The Guardian, 2016. “Best Books of 2015” in L.A. Times. For Bad Sex. 
 “Best Story,” The Paris Review Daily. 2012.
 “Best Books of 2009.” Times Literary Supplement (chosen by Craig Raine), The Guardian (chosen by Jonathan Franzen), Publisher’s Weekly, Kansas City Star. For How to Sell. 
 The Pushcart Prize. 2008. 
 UMKC Trustees’ Faculty Scholars Award. 2007. 
 Distinguished Teaching Award. Department of Philosophy. University of Texas at Austin. 2003. 
 Outstanding Teaching Award. Department of Philosophy. University of Texas at Austin. 2001, 2002.

References

External links
 "Lite-Brite," by Clancy Martin, in Gulf Coast: A Journal of Literature and Fine Arts (25.1)
 Interview with Clancy Martin at Gigantic magazine
 Interview with Clancy Martin at MobyLives
 http://harpers.org/blog/2013/01/can-we-truly-love-our-enemies/
 http://www.theparisreview.org/blog/2012/05/02/an-event-in-the-stairwell/
 http://harpers.org/blog/2014/03/on-hypocrisy/
 http://onpoint.wbur.org/2014/04/14/hypocrisy-harpers-humanity
 http://ndpr.nd.edu/news/24378-the-philosophy-of-deception/

Living people

21st-century Canadian male writers
21st-century Canadian novelists
21st-century Canadian philosophers
Canadian male non-fiction writers
Canadian male novelists
Harper's Magazine people
Place of birth missing (living people)
University of Missouri faculty
University of Missouri–Kansas City faculty
1967 births